Marcin Pontus (born 22 September 1985 in Opole) is a Polish footballer who spent most of his career in clubs across Poland, but also featured in Slovakia and the Czech Republic, Cyprus and Spain.

Career
He was a trainee of WSP Wodzisław Śląski, and he signed for Lech Poznań in 2004. Pontus played in Spain for Horadada (Tercera División), before returning to Poland in 2007.

Notes
Profile YouTube https://www.youtube.com/watch?v=KmancAU-ep4

Polish footballers
Lech Poznań players
Odra Opole players
Association football forwards
Sportspeople from Opole
Expatriate footballers in Cyprus
Polish expatriate sportspeople in Cyprus
Expatriate footballers in the Czech Republic
Polish expatriate sportspeople in the Czech Republic
1985 births
Living people
UD Horadada players
GKS Jastrzębie players
FK Bodva Moldava nad Bodvou players
2. Liga (Slovakia) players
Expatriate footballers in Slovakia
Polish expatriate sportspeople in Slovakia
Expatriate footballers in Spain
Polish expatriate sportspeople in Spain
ASIL Lysi players